Johnny Melville (born 27 January 1948 in Leith, Scotland) is a clown, actor and mime who is part of the group of artists who in the 1970s revolutionized the world of the clown in Europe, alongside names like Jango Edwards and Nola Rae in the historic Friends Roadshow in Amsterdam. In recent years he has combined his work as a clown, mime and trainer with that of actor in alternative filmmaking.

Career 

He began his professional career in 1972, working alongside names typical of the British theatre scene as David Aukin or John Bolton. Until 1977 he was actor in and director of the alternative theater company Salakta Balloon Band, and later and until 1979 by the London theater company Kaboodle Theater. However, it was in 1978 that he began his career as a soloist at the Festival of Fools, a career that screened him for all kinds of European festivals in Germany, Holland, Austria, Denmark, France, Sweden, Italy, Japan, Russia, Canada (he performed twice at Montreal's celebrated Just for Laughs festival) and the United States, working both in performing and conducting shows. His popularity as a mime and clown was so great that in 1987 they spent a ten-day Johnny Melville Festival in Denmark, where Melville offered his last five shows.

Melville has also alternated his talent as a clown and mime with performances in short films, feature films, TV series and TV movies of all kinds and in multiple countries (mostly on the alternative film circuit), but also in television advertising and even alongside trendy music groups, highlighting the collaboration he made with the Swiss group Yello in 1988. As an actor he has worked under the direction of names like Vanna Paoli, Dieter Meier, Ricard Reguant, Antonio Chafrawias, Mario Orfini, Michael Knighton, among many others. In 2001 he won the Best Actor Award at the Brooklyn Film Festival in New York for the film No Man's Land, directed by Nina Rosenmeier.

In recent years he has combined his formative performances and workshops of mime, gesture and clown with the cinema, direction and writing of scripts, in addition to having made a leap to Latin American clown programs and festivals, visiting with some frequency Colombia, Brazil, Mexico or Chile.

References

External links 
 Official website of Johnny Melville
 

1948 births
Living people
Scottish male stage actors
Scottish male film actors
Scottish male television actors